Jens Als Andersen (born 22 August 1958) is a Danish sailor who has competed in four Paralympics games winning silver in 2000 in the single person keelboat the 2.4m / Norlin Mk3. His professional career was as director at A.P. Møller-Mærsk, the world's largest container shipping company. He broke his back in an accident in 1974 and has competed three times in the Single handed Trans-Atlantic Race (formerly the OSTAR).

References

External links
 
 

1958 births
Living people
Danish disabled sportspeople
Danish male sailors (sport)
World champions in sailing for the Netherlands
Disabled sailing world champions
Paralympic sailors of the Netherlands
Sailors at the 2000 Summer Paralympics
Sailors at the 2004 Summer Paralympics
Sailors at the 2008 Summer Paralympics
Sailors at the 2012 Summer Paralympics
Paralympic medalists in sailing
Paralympic silver medalists for Denmark